Chroomonas is a genus of cryptophytes first described by Anton Hansgirg. It includes the species Chroomonas elegans, Chroomonas placoidea, Chroomonas baltica, Chroomonas guttula and Chroomonas vectensis.

References

Cryptomonad genera